Washington Gateway Main Street (WGMS) is a 501(c)(3) business development and neighborhood improvement organization. WGMS's mission is to develop and sustain the economic vitality of the commercial and residential neighborhoods along Washington Street in the South End and Lower Roxbury.

Overview 
In 1995, Mayor Thomas M. Menino appointed the Washington Street Task Force to begin the revitalization effort of the district. In 1997, Washington Gateway Main Street was founded by Task Force members Sheila Grove and Randi Lathrop to help implement the redevelopment plan.

WGMS's initial vision was "Washington Street will be a safe, inviting, tree-lined boulevard that draws people to its parks, shops, cafes and quality services. Known for its efficient transportation, vibrant architecture, abundance of artists, and its cultural, age, and economic diversity, it will be a shopping destination for the unusual and ordinary, and a desirable place to live, work, shop, and visit."

Current work

Economic development 
WGMS works to preserve the economic vitality of the South End. To this end the organization supports local businesses and works to recruit new ones that will add foot traffic and vibrancy to the area. WGMS also created the Neighborhood Guide, which has information about the local economy, and neighborhood demographics.

Community involvement 
WGMS encourages community involvement through a number of local initiatives. WGMS leverages over 800 hours of volunteer time for community clean-up days, fun neighborhood events, development project review, urban planning and much more each year. WGMS joins with the South End Business Alliance and local retailers for the Holiday Stroll, The South End Sidewalk Sale and other initiatives throughout the year as well.

Business assistance 
WGMS offers a variety of services for new and existing businesses. From business recruitment to licensing and permitting guidance, one-on-one technical assistance, storefront improvement grants and more. WGMS partners with Boston's Department of Neighborhood Development to further support and assist businesses.

Local events 
WGMS organizes a number of events each year, including Neckties, the Halloween Festival, and Summer Soulstice. These events encourage community-building and highlight local businesses in the South End.

Neckties 
Washington Gateway Main Street's signature fundraising event, celebrating the cuisine, culture and small businesses of the South End. Every fall this event brings nearly 200 community members together for a reception with an auction and dinner to follow at incredible neighborhood restaurants.

Summer Soulstice 
Celebrate the start of summer and the long days with live music, food trucks and a beer garden at Blackstone Square.

Ramsay Park 
WGMS collaborates with other local organizations to plan fun activities and community events in Ramsay Park from spring to fall.

Boston Shines/Fall Clean-Up 
WGMS gathers volunteers, gets gloves, rakes, shovels and trash bags, and helps do some spring cleaning on the streets and in the parks towards the end of April or early in May. And in the fall WGMS clears leaves and plants bulbs that pop the following spring.

Halloween Festival 
A seasonal festival the Saturday before Halloween back in Blackstone Square.  There are activities for all ages, including, pumpkin decorating, face painting,  a kid's dance party, and a costume contest for dogs along with a dj and live music. Food trucks keep people fed and Stella Restaurant offers a beer garden on their patio.

Holiday Shopping Night 
WGMS works with South End Business Alliance to encourage holiday shopping in the South End and support the local businesses by offering one-night-only deals and specials in December.

Awards 
Great American Main Street Award (2005)
American Planning Association's Great Streets in America (2008)

References

External links  
Washington Gateway Main Street

Non-profit organizations based in Boston